Tassullo (Ladin: Tasul)  is a frazione of the municipality of Ville d'Anaunia (municipality) in Trentino in the northern Italian region Trentino-Alto Adige/Südtirol, located about  north of Trento.

The municipality of Ville d'Anaunia contains the frazioni (subdivisions, mainly villages and hamlets) Rallo, Sanzenone, Pavillo, Tassullo, Campo, Tuenno, Nanno and Portolo.

Tassullo borders the following municipalities: Sanzeno and Cles.

Demographic evolution

References

External links
 Homepage of the city

Cities and towns in Trentino-Alto Adige/Südtirol